The following is a list of notable events and releases that happened in 2014 in music in Australia.

Events

January
On 1 January 2014, MTV Music launched on Australian IPTV provider FetchTV.
Big Day Out took place from January 19 through to February 2, headlined by Pearl Jam and Arcade Fire. Original co-headliners Blur, as well as DIIV, withdrew from the lineup. As of 2020, this year's festival is the most recent that has been held.
Australia Day Live Concert took place on January 25. This year's lineup contained Lior, Matt Corby, Megan Washington, and DJ Havana Brown. It was the eleventh year that the concert took place and it was held in the Parliament House

February

Soundwave took place in mid-February and early March. Its components included more than 50 musical acts which featured the genres of rock, metal and punk.

March

April

May

June
Melbourne International Singers Festival took place from June 4 to 9 in Melbourne.
On June 26, Big Day Out owners C3 confirmed that the 2015 edition of the festival had been cancelled, with a possible return in the future.

July
 Splendour in the Grass 2014 took place from July 25 to 27 at North Byron Parklands in Yelgun, New South Wales, headlined by Outkast, Foals (replacing former headliners Two Door Cinema Club) and Lily Allen.

August
Shockwave Festival took place on August 2 and 3 in Blackall

September

October

November

December

Deaths
June 4 – Doc Neeson, 67, Irish-Australian singer-songwriter (The Angels) 
August 8 – Peter Sculthorpe, composer

Bands disbanded
Bored Nothing
Fire! Santa Rosa Fire!
Hunting Grounds
Papa Vs Pretty
Snakadaktal

Album and Singles releases

January

February

March
On March 14, Kylie Minogue released Kiss Me Once. It launched in Europe, starting on 24 September 2014 at the Echo Arena in Liverpool, England.
Kate Miller-Heidke released "O Vertigo!" on March 14, 2014.
Jai Waetford released Get to Know You on March 28, 2014

April

May

June
The Veronicas released "You Ruin Me", their first single in six years.

July

August

September

October

November

December

See also
List of number-one singles of 2014 (Australia)
List of number-one albums of 2014 (Australia)

References

 
Australian
Australian music